The Autódromo Monterrey is a racetrack in Apodaca, Nuevo León, México, in the Monterrey metropolitan area. The track currently is operated by DIPSA and host races for NASCAR México, drag racing, karting and Volks races.

History

The track is located front the Del Norte International Airport. The Autódromo was inaugurated in 1970 by Filiberto Jiménez. In the 1970s, 500 km of Monterrey was the main event in this circuit.

Layout

The track has a long straight (used for drag racing), followed by a chicane (turn 1) which takes the drivers to a hairpin turn. Turn 6 is another chicane, together with T1 was added later. Originally the last curve was a banking turn, now used in the short layout. In the long version there is a bypass that conducts to the second part of this turn.

There is a second course called El Frijol for its bean's shape. This is a Dogleg oval  in length. In this course the first turn is flat and the second is a banking turn.

Races

Formula K

Formula 2

NASCAR México

Lap records

The official race lap records at the Autódromo Monterrey are listed as:

Fatalities

American racer Ron Sheldon died in the 1971 Mexico 1000.

In 1993, running in Formula 2, Marco Magaña was hit by a rock in the head. He died instantaneously. A spectator died in the same accident.

In the inaugural season of Desafío Corona, now NASCAR Corona Series, Marcelo Nuñez avoiding an incident hit the wall in turn 1 creating a cloud of dust blocking the view of incoming drivers. Then, Rafael Vallina hit Nuñez's car in the right side. Nuñez had several injuries including perforation of lung, and died 8 days later in the Muguerza hospital.

References

External links
Autodromo de Monterrey race results at Racing-Reference

MOnterrey
NASCAR tracks
Sports venues in Nuevo León